The United States census of 1850 was the seventh census of the United States.
Conducted by the Census Office, it determined the resident population of the United States to be 23,191,876—an increase of 35.9 percent over the 17,069,453 persons enumerated during the 1840 census. The total population included 3,204,313 slaves.

Although the official date of the census date was June 1, 1850, completed census forms indicate that the surveys continued to be made throughout the rest of the year.

This was the first census where there was an attempt to collect information about every member of every household; women and children were named. Slaves were included by gender and estimated age on Slave Schedules, listed by the name of the owner. Prior to 1850, census records had recorded only the name of the head of the household and broad statistical accounting of other household members (three children under age five, one woman between the age of 35 and 40, etc.).  This was also the first census to ask about place of birth of free residents.

Hinton Rowan Helper made extensive use of the 1850 census results in his influential anti-slavery book The Impending Crisis of the South (1857).

Census questions

The 1850 census, Schedule 1, Free Inhabitants, collected the following information:
 name
 age
 sex
 color (white, black or mulatto) for each person
 whether deaf and dumb, blind, psychologically ill or idiotic
 value of real estate owned (required of all free persons)
 profession, occupation or trade of each male over 15 years of age
 place (state, territory or country) of birth
 whether married within the year
 whether attended school within the year
 whether unable to read and write (for persons over 20)
 whether a pauper or convict

Full documentation for the 1850 population census, including census forms and enumerator instructions, is available from the Integrated Public Use Microdata Series.

Economy

The 1850 United States census collected a great amount of data that gave insight into the state of the U.S. economy in 1850. Some of the data revealed the growth of the economy with regard to agricultural and manufactured production, international trade, federal debt, taxation, transportation, education, and land expansion.

Agricultural Production This census calculated the total land by state (in square miles), the total production of major goods and livestock per state (in respective units), the total value of each good produced, the total number of plantations per state, and various other statistics. The total agricultural production between in 1850 was calculated at about 1.3 billion dollars.

Manufactured Production This census included the total manufactured production (in dollars), the total amount of capital invested, the total value of wages paid, the percent of profit (by state and total), the profit by state of major industries (cotton, wool, various iron work, breweries, fishing, salt), and other less significant statistics. Total manufactured production was valued at just over one billion dollars. This is a great increase over the totals estimated in 1820 and 1840. Also, in total, the manufacturing industry recorded an overall profit of 43%.

International Trade The 1850 census contains the total value of imports and exports by state, statistics and names of the major imports and exports, the total values of shipping by state, and the value of imports and exports with various individual countries. The United States traded most with the United Kingdom. The imports and exports with the United Kingdom were both valued around 145 million dollars.

Federal Debt This census contains yearly federal debt totals, total federal revenues, and total expenditures from 1790 to 1853. The total debt of the United States on July 1, 1854, was roughly 47.2 million dollars.

Taxation The census contains some calculation of total annual federal taxes, but it is incomplete. It does however, give state taxation totals.

Transportation and Communication This census calculates the total cost, size, and quantity of railroads and canals. The funded debt for railroads and canals in 1853 was 130 million. Their gross earnings were more than 38 million dollars. This census also contains estimates for growth in mileage of telegraphic lines in the United States. In 1853 the country contains 89 telegraph lines that stretched . When published in 1854, the country had an estimated  of telegraphic lines, a drastic increase.

Education This census displays the advances of the United States in education and literacy by documenting the number of libraries, the number of schools (public, private, and colleges), state literacy rates, the total newspaper production and consumption, the educational levels of differing races, the total value of tuition costs, the amount of federal land given for education, and other various statistics.

Land Expansion The 1850 census shows the great amount of territorial expansion that took place in the United States, following the Admission of Texas, the Oregon Treaty, and the Treaty with Mexico following the war in 1848. These three pieces of territory totaled an addition of more than a million square miles to the nation. In 1850, the United States contained 31 states and 4 organized territories (Minnesota, New Mexico, Oregon, Utah).

Significance The 1850 United States census can be seen as a historical document that gives insight into the state of the nation's economy in 1850. It is much more detailed and provides more information than the 1840 census.
This census was conducted during a very important period of growth and innovation in the United States, the Industrial Revolution. The statistics in this census provide data on the rate of growth that was taking place in 1850, which resulted in the emergence of the United States as an economic world power. Many of the statistics were compared to those of Great Britain and other world powers. This shows where the United States stood economically relative to the rest of the world.

Data availability
Microdata from the 1850 population census are freely available through the Integrated Public Use Microdata Series. Aggregate data for small areas, together with compatible cartographic boundary files, can be downloaded from the National Historical Geographic Information System.

State rankings

City rankings

Controversy
The Utah Territorial census was taken in 1851. Secretary Broughton Harris refused to certify the census of Utah territory. Harris complained that Brigham Young had conducted the census without him, claimed several irregularities, and consequently withheld funds reserved for the census. The controversy contributed to Harris' decision to join other Runaway Officials of 1851 and abandon his post in Utah Territory. Relationships with the federal government continued to sour and eventually resulted in the Utah War.

Local government officials feared having an enslaved population might impede the territory's quest for statehood, since certain members of Congress were concerned about expansion of slavery into the western territories. The 1850 census slave schedule for Utah Territory reported only 26 slaves, with a note that all of them were heading to California, and did not include any enslaved people remaining in the territory. John David Smith estimates that there were 100 blacks in Utah by 1850, with two-thirds of them enslaved.

See also
 Joseph C. G. Kennedy – Supervisor of the 1850 and 1860 census

References

External links

 Historical US census data 
 http://www2.census.gov/prod2/decennial/documents/1850c-01.pdf

United States Census, 1850
United States census
United States